The 1948 Troy State Red Wave football team represented Troy State Teachers College (now known as Troy University) as a member of the Alabama Intercollegiate Conference (AIC) during the 1948 college football season. Led by second-year head coach Fred McCollum, the Red Wave compiled an overall record of 6–5, with a mark of 3–1 in conference play, and lost to Jacksonville State in the Paper Bowl.

Schedule

References

Troy State
Troy Trojans football seasons
Troy State Red Wave football